Twelve Angry Men is an American courtroom drama written by Reginald Rose concerning the jury of a homicide trial. It was broadcast initially as a television play in 1954. The following year it was adapted for the stage. It was adapted for a film of the same name, directed by Sidney Lumet and released in 1957. Since then it has been given numerous remakes, adaptations, and tributes.

Description

The play explores the deliberations of a jury of a homicide trial, in which a dozen "men with ties and a coat" decide the fate of a teenager accused of murdering his abusive father. At the beginning, they are nearly unanimous in concluding the youth is guilty. One man dissents, declaring him "not guilty", and he sows a seed of reasonable doubt. Eventually he convinces the other jurors to support a unanimous "not guilty" verdict.

American writer Reginald Rose first wrote this work as a teleplay for the Studio One anthology television series; it aired as a live CBS Television production on 20 September 1954. He adapted the drama for the stage in 1955 under the same title.

Stage productions

Rose wrote several stage adaptations of the story. In other theatrical adaptations in which female actors are cast, the play is retitled 12 Angry Jurors, 12 Angry Men and Women or 12 Angry Women.

One early adaptation was staged in San Francisco in 1955.

In 2003 at the Edinburgh Fringe Festival, the British producer/director Guy Masterson directed an all-comedian revival at the Assembly Rooms, including Bill Bailey as Juror 4, Phil Nichol as Juror 10, Owen O'Neill as Juror 8, Stephen Frost as Juror 3, and Russell Hunter as Juror 9. The production broke the existing box office record for drama at the Fringe Festival and garnered much critical acclaim.

In 2004, the Roundabout Theatre Company presented a Broadway production of the play at the American Airlines Theatre, starring Boyd Gaines as Juror No. 8, with James Rebhorn (No. 4), Philip Bosco (No. 3), and Robert Prosky as the voice of the judge. In 2007, 12 Angry Men ran on a national theatre tour with Richard Thomas and George Wendt starring as Jurors No. 8 and No. 1, respectively. The 2008 tour did not include Wendt but featured Kevin Dobson, of Kojak and Knots Landing, as Juror No. 10.

In 2004/5, the British producer/director Guy Masterson directed a hugely successful Australian version of his hit Edinburgh 2003 production, produced by Arts Projects Australia and Adrian Bohm at QPAC Brisbane, Sydney Theatre and Melbourne Athenaeum. Shane Bourne played as Juror 3, Peter Phelps as Juror 4, Marcus Graham as Juror 8, George Kapiniaris as Juror 2, and Henri Szeps as Juror 9. This production won three Melbourne Green Room Awards and a nomination for "Best Play" at the Sydney Helpmann Awards.

Several London West End productions of the play have been made. In 1964, Leo Genn headed a cast which included Mark Kingston, Paul Maxwell, Arnold Ridley and Robert Urquhart. In 1996 a production at the Comedy Theatre directed by Harold Pinter starred Kevin Whately, with Timothy West, Peter Vaughan and Whately's fellow actor in the British comedy-drama Auf Wiedersehen, Pet Tim Healy, with a star of the first movie version EG Marshall as the voice of the judge. A further revival opened in November 2013 at the Garrick Theatre and was extended until June 2014, starring Tom Conti, Jeff Fahey, Nick Moran and Robert Vaughn.

In June 2022, Theater Latté Da in Minneapolis will open a world premiere musical adaptation based on Reginald Rose's teleplay called Twelve Angry Men: A New Musical, with a book by David Simpatico and music and lyrics by Michael Holland.

In other media

Films

It was written again in 1957 as a feature film, 12 Angry Men, which Sidney Lumet directed, and which starred Henry Fonda. It was nominated for Academy Awards in the categories of Best Director, Best Picture, and Best Writing of Adapted Screenplay.

Indian director Basu Chatterjee remade it as Ek Ruka Hua Faisla in 1986.

In 2007, Russian film director Nikita Mikhalkov completed 12, his remake of the film. The jury of the 64th Venice Film Festival assigned its special prize to this remake "to acknowledge the consistent brilliance of Nikita Mikhalkov's body of work".

12 Angry Lebanese is a 2009 documentary film that chronicles efforts to stage an adaptation of Twelve Angry Men with inmates inside Beirut's Roumieh Prison.

In 2014, Chinese film director Xu Ang remade it as 12 Citizens. It was shown at the 2014 Rome Film Festival on October 19, 2014 and was released in China on May 15, 2015.

Vaaimai (2016) is a Tamil language adaptation of Twelve Angry Men.

Television

12 Angry Men was remade for television in 1997. Directed by William Friedkin, the remake stars George C. Scott, James Gandolfini, Tony Danza, William Petersen, Ossie Davis, Hume Cronyn, Courtney B. Vance, Armin Mueller-Stahl, Mykelti Williamson, Edward James Olmos, Dorian Harewood, and Jack Lemmon. In this production, the judge is a woman and four of the jurors are black, but most of the action and dialogue of the film are identical to the original. Modernizations include a prohibition on smoking in the jury room, the changing of references to income and pop culture figures, more dialogue relating to race, discussion about who else could have committed the murder if it wasn't the defendant, references to execution by lethal injection as opposed to the electric chair, and occasional profanity.

In 1963, the German Television Channel ZDF produced a film adaption under the title .

Radio
In 2005, L.A. Theatre Works recorded an audio version of 12 Angry Men, directed by John de Lancie, with a cast including Dan Castellaneta, Jeffrey Donovan, Héctor Elizondo, Robert Foxworth, Kevin Kilner, Richard Kind, Armin Shimerman, Joe Spano and Steve Vinovich.

Characters

Homages and references in other works
 On the Norman Lear CBS sitcom All in the Family, Edith Bunker (Jean Stapleton) was the lone juror who questioned the evidence against the defendant, despite the pressure from her bigoted socialite co-juror (Doris Singleton) in the first-season episode, "Edith Has Jury Duty." 
The first animated homage to Twelve Angry Men was Hanna-Barbera's The Flintstones, also TV's first prime time animated series. In the sixth-season episode "Disorder in the Court," Fred (Alan Reed) is foreman and, believes the defendant is innocent even though (in a twist original) it's obvious that he is not. Fred changes his vote and when he announces the guilty verdict in court, the defendant—called "The Mangler" (Henry Corden)—threatens Fred with revenge when released from prison. 
A fifth-season episode of the BBC TV series Hancock's Half Hour called "Twelve Angry Men" is a parody of the original film with the central concept being reversed. Hancock spends the episode trying to convince the jury that a man caught red handed stealing some jewellery is innocent when he is clearly guilty. 
 An episode of the TV series The Dick Van Dyke Show, aired March 7, 1962 and entitled "One Angry Man". In this episode, Rob Petrie is the only juror who believes the defendant (Sue Ane Langdon) to be innocent.
 The Newhart episode "Twelve Annoyed Men...and Women" features main character Dick Loudon as foreman of a jury that is set to convict a bird thief, until one holdout votes "not guilty." The lone dissenter reveals that he voted for acquittal only because he wanted to spend more time with the members of the jury.
 The animated television series Pepper Ann features an episode titled "One Angry Woman". Pepper Ann's mother Lydia is called into jury duty for a case involving a supposed spitter. The events play out similarly to the original, complete with certain lines spoofed and altered for the episode.
 An episode of the TV series Monk, "Mr. Monk Gets Jury Duty", strongly spoofs the original 12 Angry Men teleplay. In this episode, the jury is presiding over the case of a man accused of stabbing another man attempting to make a bank deposit. Many of the jurors resemble a 12 Angry Men juror in some way or form.
 A Season 11 episode of Family Guy, "12 and a Half Angry Men", is a parody of the film. The town mayor is accused of murder, and Brian and Peter are called to the jury. Brian takes the role of the eighth juror.
 A Season 2 episode of Murder, She Wrote features a parody of the film (however, both men and women are included on this jury), with Jessica Fletcher and eleven other jurors seeking to determine the guilt or innocence of both a man and a woman.
 Season Three of Inside Amy Schumer devoted an episode to one sketch, a parody of 12 Angry Men. The twelve men must decide if Amy Schumer is "hot enough" to have her own TV show.
In a 1996 episode of Early Edition, titled "The Jury", Gary is the only juror who believes a man accused of embezzlement is innocent. Similarities to Twelve Angry Men include a European juror, a retiree, a meek juror, and a juror who cares little about the case. 
The King of the Hill Season Three episode "Nine Pretty Darn Angry Men" parodies 12 Angry Men with the characters as part of a focus group for a new lawnmower. Hank in the role based on juror 8 opposed to the new mower while the others praise it.
The title of an episode in Season Two of Veronica Mars, "One Angry Veronica", references the film as the main plot and is concerned with Veronica being called for jury duty.
The That Girl episode "Eleven Angry Men and That Girl," had the show's main character Ann Marie convince a jury that a person who was accused of domestic violence should be found innocent, only to see them strike their spouse in court after the verdict is announced.
 In Blue Bloods season 4, episode 8, "Justice Served", Danny Reagan dissents as Juror #8.

References

 
American plays
Broadway plays
Drama Desk Award-winning plays
Edgar Award-winning works
Plays based on television plays
West End plays
Juries in fiction
Courtroom dramas
12 (number)